Milo Mićunović (born 25 June 1992) is a Serbian football midfielder who plays for Radnički Svilajnac.

References

External links
 
 Milo Mićunović stats at utakmica.rs 
 
 juznevesti.com
 Profile at srbijafudbal.com 

1992 births
Living people
People from Smederevska Palanka
Serbian footballers
Association football forwards
Serbian expatriate footballers
Expatriate footballers in Belarus
Serbian SuperLiga players
FK Jagodina players
FK Car Konstantin players
FC Isloch Minsk Raion players